The Piasa or Piasa Bird is a creature from Native American mythology depicted in one of two murals painted by Native Americans on cliffsides above the Mississippi River. Its original location was at the end of a chain of limestone bluffs in Madison County, Illinois at present-day Alton, Illinois.  The original Piasa illustration no longer exists; a newer 20th-century version, based partly on 19th-century sketches and lithographs, has been placed on a bluff in Alton, Illinois, several hundred yards upstream from its origin. The limestone rock quality is unsuited for holding an image, and the painting must be regularly restored.  The original site of the painting was on lithographic limestone, which was quarried away in the late 1870s by the Mississippi Lime Company.

History

Murals
The original mural was created prior to the arrival of any European explorers in the region. The location of the image was at a river-bluff terminus of the American Bottom floodplain. It may have been an older iconograph from the large Mississippian culture city of Cahokia, which began developing about 900 CE. Cahokia was at its peak about 1200 CE, with 20,000 to 30,000 residents. It was the largest prehistoric city north of Mexico and a major chiefdom. Icons and animal pictographs such as falcons, thunderbirds, bird men, and monstrous snakes were common motifs of the Cahokia culture.

An Alton Evening Telegraph newspaper article of May 27, 1921 stated that seven smaller painted images, carved and painted in rocks, believed to be of archaic American Indian origin, were found in the early 20th century about 1.5 miles upriver from the ancient Piasa creature's location. These pictures were  authenticated in the Levis Bluffs area by George Dickson and William Turk in 1905. According to the article, four of these paintings were of "an owl, a sun circle, a squirrel, and a piece showing two birds or some kind of animals in a contest", the other three paintings were of "a great animal, perhaps a lion, and another an animal about as large as a coyote". These paintings were photographed by Professor William McAdams and were to be placed in his book Records of Ancient Races in the Mississippi Valley. These seven archaic American Indian paintings were lost in transit to the Missouri Historical Society c. 1922. Other Native American carved petroglyphs of a similar time period and region as the Piasa monster are carved into the rocks at Washington State Park in Missouri about 60 miles southwest of the current Piasa image.

The 1797-8 map of French explorer Nicolas De Finiels' shows the cliffs above the Piasa labeled as Hauteurs De Paillisa.

An earlier 1778 map titled "A new map of the western parts of Virginia, Pennsylvania, Maryland and North Carolina; comprehending the river Ohio, and all the rivers, which fall into it; part of the river Mississippi, the whole of the Illinois River, ... Author Hutchins, Thomas, 1730-1789" clearly shows the place name "PIASAS" where the present day City of Alton is located and bounded by the Wood River to the east. This map is one of the earliest documented references for the word Piasa.

Discovery

In 1673, Father Jacques Marquette saw the painting on a limestone bluff overlooking the Mississippi River while exploring the area. He recorded the following description:

"While skirting some rocks, which by their height and length inspired awe, we saw upon one of them two painted monsters which at first made us afraid, and upon which the boldest savages dare not long rest their eyes. they are as large as a calf; they have horns on their heads like those of a deer, a horrible look, red eyes, a beard like a tiger's, a face somewhat like a man's, a body covered with scales, and so long a tail that it winds all around the body, passing above the head and going back between the legs, ending in a fish's tail. green, red, and black are the three colors composing the picture. Moreover, these two monsters are so well painted that we cannot believe that any savage is their author; for good painters in France would find it difficult to reach that place conveniently to paint them. Here is approximately the shape of these monsters, as we have faithfully copied it."

The French cartographer Jean-Baptiste-Louis Franquelin compiled a map titled ″The Mississippi″ in about the year 1682, from Louis Jolliet′s description of his 1673 journey with Father Marquette. A creature similar to the underwater panther is sketched on the map east of the Missouri River and south of the Illinois River. As in Marquette′s description the animal is wingless with no resemblance to a bird.
 
Later French explorers, like St. Cosme, reported that by 1699 the series of images were badly worn due to the habits of the local Indians to "discharge their weapons" at the images as they passed.  Author A. D. Jones, in his book "Illinois and the West" c. 1838, also describes the ravages of weapons (firearms) upon the images, and further refers to the paintings as being named "Piasua".<ref>Jones, Abner Dumont, Illinois and the West: With a Township Map, Containing the Latest Surveys and Improvements” (1838)</ref>

The original image was the largest Native American painting ever found in North America.

John Russell account
The monster depicted in the mural was first referred to as the "Piasa Bird" in an article published c. 1836 by John Russell of Bluffdale, Illinois. John Russell was a professor of Greek and Latin at Shurtleff College, Upper Alton, Illinois. The article was entitled "The Tradition of The Piasa" and Russell claimed the origin of the word to be from a nearby stream: "This stream is the Piasa. Its name is Indian, and signifies, in the Illini, "The Bird That Devours Men." The original Piasa Creek ran through the main ravine in downtown Alton, and was completely covered by huge drainage pipes around 1912. According to the story published by Russell, the creature depicted by the painting was a huge bird that lived in the cliffs. Russell claimed that this creature attacked and devoured people in nearby Indian villages shortly after the corpses of a war gave it a taste for human flesh. The legend claims that a local Indian chief, named Chief Ouatoga, managed to slay the monster using a plan given to him in a dream from the Great Spirit. The chief ordered his bravest warriors to hide near the entrance of the Piasa Bird's cave, which Russell also claimed to have explored. Ouatoga then acted as bait to lure the creature out into the open. As the monster flew down toward the Indian chief, his warriors slew it with a volley of poisoned arrows. Russell claimed that the mural was painted by the Indians as a commemoration of this heroic event.

Some sources report that this account was simply a story created by John Russell. In the book Records of Ancient Races in the Mississippi Valley ...  Chapter 2, 1887 by W. McAdams, the author says he contacted John Russell, who admitted the story was fabricated.

The bird imagery is not reported in Father Marquette's description, which makes no mention of wings. It is also possible that Marquette's description and Russell's account were both accurate for their respective times.  The image may have been repainted at some point between 1673 and 1836 to revise its appearance.

When contemporary historians, folklorists, and tourism promoters are looking for a narrative description of the story behind the Piasa "Bird", they often rely on Russell's account.

Origin Story
Esarey, Costa, Wood, et al now link the Underwater Panther to the Piasa both iconographically and phonetically to proper legend.  "Payiihsa" is a "small supernatural being" and "pai'ssa" was referenced in an early explorer's list of supernatural beings.  The "Payiihsa" often bear large feet with 4 or 6 toes and are referenced frequently in pottery and rock art symbolism along with the symbolism of the underwater panther.  (To complicate matters, the term "Piasa" was applied in the 1970's to any symbolism matching the "protean super theme" of underwater panthers.)  Costa's research in 2005 led to a Miami-Illinois Indian's tale of the malevolent twin dwarves (the "Payiihsaki"), the underwater panther, and the supernatural culture hero known as the Illinois Trickster, "Wissa Katch Akwa" who encounter a French trader.  This legend of the Payiihsaki and the cliff art of underwater panther, as misinterpreted by Russell and others, is now believed by Esarey to be the origin of Russell's story of the Piasa.

The Underwater Panther origin is supported by research by Dr. Mark J. Wagner, Director, Center for Archaeological Investigations and Professor, Department of Anthropology, Southern Illinois University at Carbondale.

See also

 Underwater Panther
 Manticore
 Chimera
 Teratorn
 Thunderbird (mythology)
 Horned Serpent

References

 Costa, David J. "Culture-Hero and Trickster Stories", in: Brian Swann, ed., Algonquian Spirit. Lincoln: University of Nebraska Press. 2005.
 
 O'Conner, Mallory McCane.  Lost Cities of the Ancient Southeast, Gainesville, Florida: The University Press of Florida, 1995.  
 
 Sparks, Everett. In Search of the Piasa'', Alton Museum of History and Art (1990)

Notes

External links 

 "Piasa Bird" and picture, Alton, Illinois
 History of Piasa Bird painting
 "History of the Piasa Bird", Prairie Ghosts
 "Piasa Legend", Piasa Birds
 "Flight of the Piasa" by Dr. Raymond Scott Edge, 2007, 

Rock art in North America
Legendary creatures of the indigenous peoples of North America
American legendary creatures
Archaeological sites in Illinois
Mythological hybrids
Madison County, Illinois
Tourist attractions in Jersey County, Illinois
Legendary birds
Dragons
Mythological monsters